The 2017 Roller Hockey Intercontinental Cup was the 16th edition of the roller hockey tournament known as the Intercontinental Cup, endorsed by World Skate. It was held in the Pavelló Olímpic in Reus, Spain. Benfica won the competition by beating Reus in the final (5–3). It was their second triumph in the Intercontinental Cup.

The tournament was a knockout competition in a final four format; four teams entered, with the host selected after the teams became known. Entered the tournament the European League winners from the 2015–16 and 2016–17 seasons and the South American Club Championship/Pan-American Club Championship winners from the 2016 and 2017 seasons.

Teams

Venue

Matches
In all matches, extra time and a penalty shootout were used to decide the winner if necessary.

All times are local, CET (UTC+1).

Bracket

Semi-finals

Final

Statistics

Goalscorers
With four goals, Raül Marín and Jordi Adroher were the top scorers in the tournament. In total, there were 31 goals scored by 17 different players in 3 games, for an average of 10.33 goals per game.

4 goals
 Jordi Adroher
 Raül Marín

3 goals
 Carlos Nicolía
 Mauro Giuliani

2 goals
 Exequiel Tamborindegui
 Diogo Rafael
 Àlex Rodríguez
 Albert Casanovas

1 goal
 Juan Cruz Fontán
 Carlos López
 Miguel Rocha
 João Rodrigues
 Marc Torra
 Joan Salvat
 David Páez
 Jorge Martín Maturano
 Valter Neves

Fastest goal
3 minutes: Exequiel Tamborindegui (Andes Talleres vs Benfica)

References

2017 in roller hockey
FIRS Intercontinental Cup
International roller hockey competitions hosted by Spain